Hymenocallis rotata (streambank spiderlily) is a plant in the family Amaryllidaceae, endemic to the north-central portions of the US state of Florida. It is found along the banks of spring-fed streams in the region.

The species is a perennial herb with rhizomatous bulbs, with showy flowers that open in late Spring and early Summer. The shape of the staminal corona is distinctive within the genus, rotate rather than the more common funnel-shaped, white with a yellow-green eye near the center.

References

rotata
Endemic flora of Florida
Plants described in 1805
Flora without expected TNC conservation status